Dileh (also Romanized as Dīleh) is a village in Lavandevil Rural District, Lavandevil District, Astara County, Gilan Province, Iran. At the 2006 census, its population was 71, in 12 families.

References 

Populated places in Astara County